Hollywood star can refer to:
 The Hollywood Star newspaper and magazine, a celebrity gossip publication of the 1970s.
 Movie stars, celebrities who are famous, for their starring, or leading, roles in motion pictures. 
 The star system, the method of creating and promoting movie stars in classical Hollywood cinema. 
 The Hollywood Walk of Fame, a sidewalk in Hollywood, Los Angeles, which is embedded with more than 2,000 five-pointed stars celebrating famous actors and movie characters

Two baseball teams have been known as the Hollywood Stars:
 Hollywood Stars, a Minor League Baseball team active from 1926 to 1935, and from 1938 to 1957
 Hollywood Stars (Pecos League), a professional baseball team competing in the Pecos league, founded in 2016